The 2018 Australian Open (officially known as the Crown Group Australian Open 2018 for sponsorship reasons) was a badminton tournament that took place at Quaycentre in Australia from 8 to 13 May 2018. The purse totalled $150,000.

Tournament
The 2018 Australian Open was the ninth tournament of the 2018 BWF World Tour and also part of the Australian Open championships, which had been held since 1975. This tournament was organized by Badminton Australia and sanctioned by the BWF.

Venue
This international tournament was held at Quaycentre in Sydney, Australia.

Point distribution
Below is the point distribution for each phase of the tournament based on the BWF points system for the BWF World Tour Super 300 event.

Prize money
The total prize money for this tournament was US$150,000. Distribution of prize money was in accordance with BWF regulations.

Men's singles

Seeds

 Prannoy Kumar (withdrew)
 B. Sai Praneeth (quarter-finals)
 Tanongsak Saensomboonsuk (withdrew)
 Sameer Verma (quarter-finals)
 Tommy Sugiarto (quarter-finals)
 Parupalli Kashyap (withdrew)
 Lee Cheuk Yiu (semi-finals)
 Liew Daren (first round)

Wild card
Badminton Australia awarded a wild card entry to Anthony Joe of Australia.

Finals

Top half

Section 1

Section 2

Bottom half

Section 3

Section 4

Women's singles

Seeds

 Saina Nehwal (withdrew)
 Michelle Li (first round)
 Cheung Ngan Yi (semi-finals)
 Minatsu Mitani (semi-finals)
 Neslihan Yiğit (withdrew)
 Natsuki Nidaira (withdrew)
 Brittney Tam (first round)
 Shiori Saito (first round)

Finals

Top half

Section 1

Section 2

Bottom half

Section 3

Section 4

Men's doubles

Seeds

 Berry Angriawan / Hardianto (champions)
 Wahyu Nayaka / Ade Yusuf (final)
 Manu Attri / B. Sumeeth Reddy (semi-finals)
 He Jiting / Tan Qiang (first round)
 Aaron Chia / Soh Wooi Yik (withdrew)
 Tan Boon Heong /  Yoo Yeon-seong (first round)
 Arjun M.R. / Ramchandran Shlok (quarter-finals)
 Alwin Francis / Nandagopal Kidambi (first round)

Finals

Top half

Section 1

Section 2

Bottom half

Section 3

Section 4

Women's doubles

Seeds

 Misato Aratama / Akane Watanabe (semi-finals)
 Ayako Sakuramoto / Yukiko Takahata (champions)
 Du Yue / Li Yinhui (second round)
 Baek Ha-na / Lee Yu-rim (final)

Finals

Top half

Section 1

Section 2

Bottom half

Section 3

Section 4

Mixed doubles

Seeds

Finals

Top half

Section 1

Section 2

Bottom half

Section 3

Section 4

References

External links
 Tournament Link

2018
2018 BWF World Tour
May 2018 sports events in Australia
2018 in Australian sport